Honnavar railway station is a station on Konkan Railway. It is at a distance of  down from origin. The preceding station on the line is Kumta railway station and the next station is Manki railway station.

References 

Railway stations along Konkan Railway line
Railway stations in Uttara Kannada district
Karwar railway division